Marin and Tomislav Draganja were the defending champions but only Tomislav chose to defend his title, partnering Nikola Čačić. Tomislav Draganja lost in the quarterfinals to Rameez Junaid and David Pel.

Purav Raja and Antonio Šančić won the title after defeating Junaid and Pel 5–7, 6–4, [10–5] in the final.

Seeds

Draw

References
 Main Draw

Wolffkran Open - Doubles
2018 Doubles